Ertuğrul Gazi Metin (born 1 January 1996) is a Turkish male volleyball player. He is part of the Turkey men's national volleyball team. On club level he plays for Altekma.

External links
Player profile at Galatasaray.org
Player profile at Volleybox.net

1996 births
Living people
Turkish men's volleyball players
Galatasaray S.K. (men's volleyball) players
People from Antalya
21st-century Turkish people